Qalunya (also transliterated Qaluniya) was a Palestinian village located  west of Jerusalem. 
Prior to the village's destruction in 1948, with the exception of 166 dunams, Qalunya's land was privately owned: 3,594 dunams were owned by Arabs, while 1,084 dunams were owned by Jews.

Location
Qalunya stood on a mountain slope, facing southwest; Wadi Qalunya passed through its eastern edge. The village lay on the Jerusalem-Jaffa highway, and a dirt path linked it to its neighboring villages. Qalunya was located where the Israelite and Jewish town of Motza was believed to have been. The Modern Motza is now an outlying neighborhood of Jerusalem, and ruins of demolished buildings from Qalunya are present near Motza, covered in vegetation, just off the main highway between Jerusalem and Tel Aviv. The town of Mevaseret Zion today is expanding upon some of the territory of former Qalunya.

History

Bronze Age to Roman period

Roman and Byzantine periods
The village was destroyed in the First Jewish–Roman War. After 71 CE, Vespasian settled 800 Roman soldiers in the town, which became a Roman settlement known as Colonia Amosa or Colonia Emmaus.

The word colonia produced the Byzantine-period Greek name, Koloneia, for the site. The status of the site in the early Islamic period has not been established, but the name was preserved in Crusader times as Qalonie or Qalunia and in Arabic as Qalunya. Mujir al-Din al-Hanbali reported that in 1192 it was a village near Jerusalem.

New Testament
It has also been suggested that Qalunya was Emmaus of the New Testament. The site is at more or less the correct distance from Jerusalem to match the story told in the Gospel of Luke. The village where Vespasian settled the 800 veterans was known as Emmaus at that time. The new military colony completely eclipsed the title town and its name was lost to history. During the Byzantine period the name Emmaus was not in use, so the Byzantine Christians did not know of it. The tradition of Emmaus was attached to Emmaus-Nicopolis instead.  Excavations in 2001-2003 headed by Professor Carsten Peter Thiede let him conclude that Khirbet Mizza/Tel Moza was the only credible candidate for biblical Emmaus.

Ottoman period

In the 1596  tax registers, Qalunya was a village in the Ottoman Empire, nahiya (subdistrict) of Jerusalem under the liwa' (district) of Jerusalem, and it had a population of 19 Muslim households, an estimated 110 persons. The villagers paid a fixed tax rate of 33,3% on a number of crops, including wheat, barley and olives, as well as on goats, beehives and molasses; a total of  6,450  akçe. All of the revenue went to Waqf.

In 1838, Kulonieh was noted as a Muslim village in the Beni Malik district, west of Jerusalem.

In 1863 Victor Guérin found it to be a village of 500 inhabitants, while an Ottoman village list from about 1870 found that Kalonije had a population of 120, in 43 houses, though the population count included men, only.

Travelers reported that it had a "modern" restaurant. The villagers tended orange and lemon trees that were planted around a spring in the valley. To the west of the restaurant were ruins, possible of Byzantine origin.

In the 1890s, Jews purchased some of Qalunya's farmlands, and established the village of Motza, the first Jewish settlement outside Jerusalem.

In 1896 the population of Kalonije was estimated to be about 312 persons.

British Mandate
In the 1922 census of Palestine, conducted by the British Mandate authorities, Qalunieh (Qalonia) had a population 549; 456 Muslims, 88 Jews and 5 Orthodox Christians, increasing in the 1931 census to 632, 632 Muslims and 10 Christians; in a total of 156 houses.

During the 1929 Palestine riots, several residents of Qalunya attacked an outlying house in Motza belonging to the Maklef family, killing the father, mother, son, two daughters, and their two guests. Three children survived by escaping out a second-story window; one, Mordechai Maklef, later became Chief of Staff of the Israeli Army. The attackers included the lone police officer and armed man in the area, as well as a shepherd employed by the Maklef family. The village was subsequently abandoned by Jews for a year's time.

In the 1945 statistics, Qalunya had a population of 900 Muslims and 10 Christians, while Motza had a population of 350 Jews.  The total land area was 4,844 dunams. A total of 1,224 dunums of land were irrigated or used for plantations, 955 were used for cereals; while 227 dunams were classified as built-up areas.

1948, and after
On 11 April 1948, as part of Operation Nachshon, Hagana forces entered the village and blew up 50 houses. According to Ilan Pappe, Qalunya was one of four villages that were systematically destroyed by Hagana units in this fashion in the immediate wake of the Deir Yassin massacre; the others being, Beit Surik, Biddu and Saris.

Archaeology
According to the Israel Antiquities Authority (IAA), the earliest archaeological finds of Qaluniya date back to the Early Bronze Age, Early Bronze Age I, Iron Age II, followed by artefacts retrieved from the Hellenistic-Roman, Byzantine, Early Islamic, and Crusade period. The remains of a Byzantine Church were discovered on the site.

In 2012 Israeli archaeologists discovered the Tel Motza temple, an Israelite cultic building dating to the monarchic period (Iron Age IIA).

References

Bibliography
 

 
 
 
 

 

  
 

 (p. 47)

External links
 Welcome To Qalunya
 Qalunya, Zochrot
Survey of Western Palestine, Map 17:  IAA, Wikimedia commons 
Qalunya, from the Khalil Sakakini Cultural Center

Arab villages depopulated prior to the 1948 Arab–Israeli War
Ghost towns in Asia